The Lanca Birda is a left tributary of the river Timiș in Romania. It discharges into the Timiș in Gad. The river was canalized downstream of Ghilad and at present plays the role of drainage canal of the lowlands on the left bank of the Timiș.

References

Rivers of Timiș County
Rivers of Romania